Israel Shatzman (25 November 1934 - 24 October 2017) was an Israeli historian.  He has been Professor of History at the Hebrew University of Jerusalem (1976-), a Fellow at the Israel Institute for Advanced Studies and Director at the National Library of Israel (1990-1997). 

Shatzman was a scholar of ancient Rome and has written extensively on the Roman military.  He also has covered Judea in antiquity, both during the pre-Roman Hellenistic period and the rule of the Hasmonean kingdom, as well as the integration into the Roman empire as Roman Judea.

Bibliography 

 Senatorial Wealth and Roman Politics (Brussels: Latomus, 1975)
 The Armies of the Hasmonaeans and Herod: From Hellenistic to Roman Frameworks, (Heidelberg, Germany: Mohr Siebeck Verlag, 1991)
 The Integration of Judaea into the Roman Empire, Scripta classic israelica, Volume 18, (1999)
 The Roman Republic: From Monarchy to Julius Caesar, Chapter 2 in The Practice of Strategy: From Alexander the Great to the Present, (Oxford: Oxford University Press, 2011)

Notes 

1934 births
2017 deaths
Israeli historians

Hebrew University of Jerusalem alumni
Academic staff of the Hebrew University of Jerusalem